Khao Phanom Baek railway station is a railway station located in Pa We Subdistrict, Chaiya District, Surat Thani.

Train services 
 Local No. 445/446 Chumphon-Hat Yai Junction-Chumphon

References 
 
 

Railway stations in Thailand